The 2020 Call of Duty League season was the inaugural season for the Call of Duty League, an esports league based on the video game franchise Call of Duty.

Teams

Broadcast and viewership 
The Call of Duty League began a partnership with YouTube to become the exclusive streaming service for the league. At least 331,000 viewers watched the grand final of the CDL championship.

On July 4, Philip “Momo” Whitfield was fired from the league after several allegations of sexual misconduct surfaced on the internet. Ten days later, Ben “Benson” Bowe revealed he's no longer working with the league. Although his legal counsel "advised him not to say why", some reported it was due to similar reasons to Momo. Thomas "Chance" Ashworth worked with Miles Ross for the rest of the season. On July 10, the league added Landon “LandO” Sanders and Jeremy “StuDyy” Astacio to become the third casting pair in the wake of Momo and Benson departing.

Regular season standings

Regular season

CDL 2020 Launch Weekend

London Royal Ravens Home Series 
Teams not in attendance: Atlanta FaZe, Florida Mutineers, OpTic Gaming Los Angeles, Minnesota ROKKR.

 Finals

Source:

Atlanta Faze Home Series 
Teams not in attendance: Dallas Empire, Los Angeles Guerrillas, New York Subliners, Seattle Surge.

 Finals

Source:

Los Angeles Home Series 
Teams not in attendance: Chicago Huntsmen, London Royal Ravens, Paris Legion, Toronto Ultra.

Finals

Source:

Dallas Empire Home Series 
Teams not in attendance: Atlanta FaZe, London Royal Ravens, New York Subliners, OpTic Gaming Los Angeles.

Finals

Source:

Chicago Huntsmen Home Series 
Teams not in attendance: Florida Mutineers, Minnesota ROKKR, Paris Legion, Toronto Ultra.

Finals

Source:

Florida Mutineers Home Series 
Teams not in attendance: Chicago Huntsmen, Dallas Empire, Los Angeles Guerrillas, Seattle Surge.

Finals

Source:

Seattle Surge Home Series 
Teams not in attendance: Atlanta FaZe, Dallas Empire, Florida Mutineers, Toronto Ultra

Finals

Source:

Minnesota RØKKR Home Series 
Teams not in attendance: London Royal Ravens, New York Subliners, OpTic Gaming Los Angeles, Paris Legion.

Finals

Source:

Paris Legion Home Series 
Teams not in attendance: Chicago Huntsmen, Los Angeles Guerrillas, Minnesota ROKKR, Seattle Surge.

Finals

Source:

New York Subliners Home Series 
Teams not in attendance: Dallas Empire, Florida Mutineers, OpTic Gaming Los Angeles, Seattle Surge.

Finals

Source:

Second London Royal Ravens Home Series 
Teams not in attendance: Atlanta Faze, Chicago Huntsmen, Minnesota ROKKR, Toronto Ultra.

Finals

Source:

Toronto Ultra Home Series 
Teams not in attendance: New York Subliners, London Royal Ravens, Paris Legion, Los Angeles Guerrillas.

Finals

Source:

Playoffs 
The playoffs and Championship Weekend began on August 19 and concluded on August 30, 2020. All twelve teams competed in the playoffs, and all matches were played online.

Bracket

Grand finals 
Best-of-9 with the team from the Winner's Bracket (WB) starting the match up 1–0.

Winnings
Teams in the 2020 season competed for a prize pool of million in the playoffs, with the payout detailed below.

References

External links
 

 
Call of Duty League seasons
Call of Duty